This is not to be mistaken with His Band and the Street Choir, an album by Van Morrison.

A street choir can either be used to refer to a choir of homeless people such as the Berlin Strassenchor or signify a political or campaigning choir, as in the UK. As the name suggests, some choirs sing on the street taking political issues and their campaigns to people in public spaces or members who live on the streets. However, not all choirs regularly sing on the street. Choirs are typically church or civil society ventures that do not have political objectives. Examples of street choirs that focus on homeless issues through campaigning are choirs like the Dallas Street choir.

Political or campaigning choirs 
UK street choirs typically have their roots in social movements. In the United Kingdom, an annual Street Choirs Festival is held in June or July over a weekend and is hosted by one or more choirs from the same town or city. The Street Choirs Festival grew out of the Street Bands Festival, the first recorded staging of which was in Sheffield in 1984.

Choirs of homeless people 
Choir of homeless people is a term for choirs across the world that are formed for two reasons: to raise the awareness of the homeless and to gather charities for the homeless. This way of charity became popular at the beginning of the XXI century mostly in Europe but also in America, Australia, Asia. Examples of homeless choirs are The Choir of Hard Knocks in Australia, San Diego Homeless choir, and the High Hopes Choir in Ireland.

External links 
Berlin Strassenchor

References 

Performing arts in the United Kingdom
Political movements in the United Kingdom
British choirs
Street performance